is a Japanese professional golfer.

Maita played on the Japan Golf Tour, winning once.

Professional wins (7)

Japan Golf Tour wins (1)

Japan PGA Senior Tour wins (6)
2010 PGA Philanthropy Senior Tournament
2013 Komatsu Open
2016 Nasu Kasumigajo Senior Open, Hiroshima Senior Golf Tournament, Sevenhills Cup KBC Senior Open
2017 Nojima Champion Cup Hakone Senior Pro Golf Tournament

External links

Japanese male golfers
Japan Golf Tour golfers
Sportspeople from Kanagawa Prefecture
1959 births
Living people